The Convergences 2007 is a political party in Mali. In the 29 April 2007 Malian presidential elections, the party's candidate, Soumeylou Boubèye Maïga, won 1.46% of the popular vote.

References 

Political parties in Mali